Nishanbaria Union is an Union Parishad under Morrelganj Upazila of Bagerhat District in the division of Khulna, Bangladesh. It has an area of 102.02 km2 (39.39 sq mi) and a population of 36,658.

References

Unions of Morrelganj Upazila
Unions of Bagerhat District
Unions of Khulna Division